Libran Nuevas Cabactulan (born February 20, 1950) is a Filipino career diplomat, who served as the 18th Ambassador and Permanent Representative of the Philippines to the United Nations, replacing former Ambassador and retired Chief Justice Hilario Davide, Jr.

Prior to his appointment, he served as Assistant Secretary for Nuclear Disarmament and Non-Proliferation. Before that, he was the Philippine Ambassador to the United Arab Emirates. Libran Cabactulan also served at the Philippine Mission to the United Nations in Geneva, Switzerland; and twice at the Philippine Mission to the United Nations in New York, United States.  He had also been assigned in the Philippine Embassy in Brussels, Belgium and the Philippine Consulate in Sydney, Australia.

In Manila, Libran Cabactulan served as the executive director of two department offices under the Department of Foreign Affairs. These are: (1) the Office of United Nations and Other International Organizations; and (2) the Office of Consular Affairs. He was also the Senior Special Assistant to the Secretary of Foreign Affairs.

During his diplomatic career, Libran Cabactulan led the Group of 77 developing countries and China in negotiations on economic and related issues at the General Assembly, the Economic and Social Council, the Commission on Sustainable Development, the Population Commission, United Nations Children’s Fund, and the United Nations Development Programme.

Before joining foreign service, he worked at the National Economic and Development Authority (NEDA) as a Staff Economist.

He obtained his Bachelor’s and Master’s Degrees in Political Science, and a Certificate in Development Economics from the University of the Philippines.  He also has a Diploma for Commercial Policy from the General Agreement on Tariffs and Trade (GATT), the predecessor of the World Trade Organization, in Geneva.

Libran is married, and has two children.

References

1950 births
Filipino diplomats
Permanent Representatives of the Philippines to the United Nations
Ambassadors of the Philippines to the United Arab Emirates
People from Camiguin
University of the Philippines Diliman alumni
Living people